James Daniel Bolla Jr. (March 27, 1952October 21, 2022) was an American college basketball coach.  He was the head women's basketball coach at the University of Nevada, Las Vegas from 1982 to 1996, with his 300 games won the most in the team's history.

Early life and education
Born in Pittsburgh, Bolla graduated from Bishop Canevin High School in 1970. He played college basketball at the University of Pittsburgh from 1971 to 1975 and was the starting center from 1973 to 1975. The 1974 team was ranked at 10th in the nation, and featured a school record 22-game winning streak. The Panthers advanced to the Elite Eight of the 1974 NCAA tournament. Bolla graduated in August 1976 with a degree in physical education.

Coaching career
From 1975 to 1977, Bolla was a volunteer assistant coach for Pittsburgh men's basketball. He was promoted to graduate assistant in 1977 and full assistant in 1978. In the 1979–80 season, Bolla moved to the Pittsburgh women's basketball program to be an assistant coach.

Bolla joined UNLV in 1981 as an assistant coach, then was head coach from 1982 to 1996. In those 14 years, Bolla had a 300–120 (.714) record, including seven NCAA tournament appearances and 11 seasons with 20 or more wins.  His 300 wins with the team were the most by a UNLV women's basketball coach at the time of his death, while his 71.4 winning percentage was second to Dan Ayala.  During the 1989–90 season, UNLV moved to second in the nation, the highest ranking in school history. That team finished with a 28–3 record, the best mark in school history. He is a three-time Big West coach of the year award winner, because of his work at UNLV. He coached six all-Americans, three Big West player of the year winners, and 24 all-conference selections. UNLV won seven Big West titles under his leadership.

From 2004 to 2009, Bolla was head coach at Hawaii before being fired for cause on April 6, 2009. The firing followed accusations of verbal and physical abuse from players.

Career outside coaching
In the 1980–81 season, Bolla was a photographer for the Eastern Eight (now Atlantic 10) Conference.

From 1996 to 2001, Bolla was director of athletic development at UNLV. In that position, he was in charge of fundraising for the athletic department. Bolla secured a $3.1 million gift for the softball and golf programs among nearly $5 million he helped raise. Bolla went into private business after UNLV declined to renew his contract.

In 2015, Bolla began co-hosting a daily sports talk show on KDWN radio in Las Vegas, Coaches' Corner with his friend, longtime NVHOF Las Vegas sportscaster Rich Perez, and later with former Raider Greg Townsend.

Personal life
Bolla was married to Dallas Boychuk. They later divorced just prior to his death.  Together, they had one daughter, Sasha.  Previously, Bolla was married to Sheila Strike, who was co-head coach with him at UNLV.  He resided in Las Vegas during his later years.

Bolla was diagnosed with cancer in August 2017.  He died on the evening of October 21, 2022, at the age of 70.

Head coaching record
Sources:

References

External links

Hawaii bio

1952 births
2022 deaths
American men's basketball players
American sports radio personalities
American women's basketball coaches
Basketball players from Pittsburgh
Centers (basketball)
Hawaii Rainbow Wahine basketball coaches
Pittsburgh Panthers men's basketball coaches
Pittsburgh Panthers men's basketball players
Pittsburgh Panthers women's basketball coaches
UNLV Lady Rebels basketball coaches